Ashland State Park is a public recreation area surrounding the  Ashland Reservoir in the town of Ashland, Massachusetts. The state park's  incorporate the entire shoreline of the reservoir, which is abutted by the Warren Conference Center and Inn of Framingham State University, town-owned land once the site of Camp Winnetaska (a Girl Scouts camp), and residential houses. The park is managed by the Massachusetts Department of Conservation and Recreation.

History

The park was created when the Ashland Reservoir, which was completed in 1895, was taken out of service in 1947. The reservoir's dam and spillway are listed on the National Register of Historic Places.

The park was unstaffed from 2009 through 2012 due to budget cuts and reopened in 2013 with funding to restore facilities that had deteriorated during the shutdown.

Activities and amenities

The park's trails are used for hiking, bicycling, and cross-country skiing. The park has wheelchair-accessible restrooms, picnic grounds and swimming beach in addition to a ramp for motorized and non-motorized boating and fishing. It is staffed seasonally.

In the news
The film Sea of Trees starring Matthew McConaughey was partially filmed in Ashland State Park in August 2014.

On August 24, 2016, an ultralight helicopter crashed into the Ashland Reservoir after experiencing engine trouble. No one was injured when the craft submerged in water up to 30 feet deep some 200 to 300 yards offshore.

References

External links
Ashland State Park Department of Conservation and Recreation
Ashland State Park Map Department of Conservation and Recreation

State parks of Massachusetts
Ashland, Massachusetts
Massachusetts natural resources
Parks in Middlesex County, Massachusetts
1947 establishments in Massachusetts
Protected areas established in 1947